Aristaea thalassias is a moth of the family Gracillariidae. It is known in Australia from the states of New South Wales, Victoria and Queensland and has been introduced to South Africa for the biological control of Australian myrtle.

The larvae feed on Agonis flexuosa and Leptospermum laevigatum. They probably mine the leaves of their host plant.

References

Aristaea
Moths of Africa
Moths described in 1880